Pyropterus is a genus of net-winged beetles belonging to the family Lycidae.

Genera
 Pyropterus nigroruber (DeGeer, 1774)

References

 Funet
 GBIF
 Encyclopedia of Life

Lycidae
Elateroidea genera